Punjab State Highway 15, commonly referred to as SH 15, is a state highway in the state of Punjab in India. This state highway runs through Ferozpur District and Faridkot District from Ferozpur to Faridkot in the state of Punjab. The total length of the highway is 30 kilometres.

Route description
The route of the highway is Ferozpur-Golewala-Faridkot

Major junctions

  National Highway 5 in Ferozpur

See also
List of state highways in Punjab, India

References 

State Highways in Punjab, India